The World of Johnny Cash is compilation album released by country singer Johnny Cash on Columbia Records in 1970 (see 1970 in music). It contains some of Cash's minor hits, as well as several songs that were never released as singles. The album reached #2 on the Country charts. It was certified Gold on 1/23/1971 by the R.I.A.A.

Track listing

Charts
Album – Billboard (United States)

References

External links
 Luma Electronic entry on The World of Johnny Cash

1970 compilation albums
Johnny Cash albums
Columbia Records albums